The 1989–90 Major Indoor Soccer League season was the 12th in league history.

Final standings

Scoring leaders

GP = Games Played, G = Goals, A = Assists, Pts = Points

All-MISL Teams

League awards
Most Valuable Player: Tatu, Dallas

Scoring Champion: Tatu, Dallas

Pass Master: Jan Goossens, Kansas City

Defender of the Year: Wes McLeod, Dallas

Rookie of the Year: Terry Brown, St Louis

Newcomer of the Year: Claudio De Olivieria, St Louis

Goalkeeper of the Year: Joe Papaleo, Dallas

Coach of the Year: Billy Phillips, Dallas

Championship Series Most Valuable Player: Brian Quinn, San Diego

Championship Series Unsung Hero: Paul Wright, San Diego

External links
 1989-90 summary at The MISL: A Look Back

Major Indoor Soccer League (1978–1992) seasons
Major
Major